Carl Edvard van Dockum was a Danish admiral and minister that was notable for his participation in the Battle of Jasmund in the Second Schleswig War.

Biography
Carl Edvard van Dockum was the son of Vice Admiral  and his wife. After a voyage to the West Indies, van Dockum went, with a passport, into French service, where he excelled in several battles such as the Battle of Navarino, and ended up being decorated with the Legion of Honor. At the end of 1829 he returned to Denmark, where he had been promoted to first lieutenant the year before.

After service as an enlistment officer, and on various ships, he became in 1840 adjutant to the Governor-General of the Danish West Indies possessions, as well as the harbor master at St. Croix and military secretary at the General Government. It was under Peter von Scholten, where van Dockum proved to be a capable and tactful negotiator, during a dispute with the government of the island of Puerto Rico, which he got settled in a way that satisfied both parties.

After returning home in 1846, he was appointed head of the Naval Academy, and in 1847 he became captain. During the First Schleswig War, in 1848 van Dockum led the corvette Flora on a blockade in the Baltic Sea, but was recalled to participate in the Danish Constituent Assembly as a member elected by the king. 

On 25 November 1850 van Dockum was briefly appointed Minister of the Navy in the Ministry of Moltke IV, a post he regained in 1866-1867 in the Ministry of Frijs.

From 1855 to 1857, van Dockum was a Member of Parliament representing Aarhus, after which he was sent to England in 1857. In 1859 he was again offered the post of Minister of the Navy, but refused, and in 1860 he rejoined the Navy as Rear Admiral. At the outbreak of Second Schleswig War, he was commander-in-chief of the navy in the eastern part of the Baltic Sea. 

Shortly after his most recent ministry, van Dockum was appointed Chief of the Naval Officers Corps and Vice Admiral, which he remained until his retirement on 1 June 1874.

He settled in Strandgade Helsingør, and in 1888 published a book entitled Gamle Minder fra Tjenesteaarene om Bord i franske Skibe 1823-29, Ernst Bojesens Forlag København written down in 1877 by C. van Dockum.

Dockum was promoted to squire in 1823, Chamberlain in 1851, became a Knight of the Dannebrog in 1843, Commander of the Dannebrog in 1853  and the Grand Cross in 1860.

He is buried in Holmen Cemetery. His surviving papers are in the Danish National Archives.

Bauditz made by F.C. Camradt on June 1833 in family ownership, a Portrait of Frederik Christian Lund's painting Paa Søen 1853 on board "Dannebrog" ( lithograph hereafter) and woodcut drawings by Henrik Olrik in 1864, 1871 and 1893.

References

Bibliography
 

1804 births
1893 deaths
19th-century Danish naval officers
Royal Danish Navy admirals
People of the First Schleswig War
Danish military personnel of the Second Schleswig War
Knights of the Order of the Dannebrog
Commanders of the Order of the Dannebrog
Grand Crosses of the Order of the Dannebrog
Recipients of the Legion of Honour
French Navy officers
French people of the Greek War of Independence